The hepatogastric ligament or gastrohepatic ligament connects the liver to the lesser curvature of the stomach.  It contains the right and the left gastric arteries.  In the abdominal cavity it separates the greater and lesser sacs on the right.  It is sometimes cut during surgery in order to access the lesser sac. The hepatogastric ligament consists of a dense cranial portion and the caudal portion termed the pars flaccida.

Additional images

References

External links
  - "Abdominal Cavity - The Lesser Omentum"
 

Abdomen